Silver Lake is a lake on the west side of the town of Silver Lake, Kansas. It is about a half mile north of the Kansas River. It originally was a part of the Kansas River and was left as a lake when the river changed course in the nineteenth century or earlier. However, it is said to be fed by a spring in the lakebed. The lake is crescent-shaped. When the town of Silver Lake was founded in 1871, the lake already existed. Silver Lake is one of at least six oxbow lakes formed from the Kansas River.

Since the lakebed is mostly shallow, the surface area of Silver Lake can vary considerably. In a drought in the 1980s the lakebed all but dried up. During times of much rain the surface area of the lake can be at least .

Silver Lake is a public lake, and boating and fishing are allowed. No swimming is permitted, and there is no public boat ramp, so boaters must obtain permission of landowners to launch boats. Almost the entire eastern side is bordered by business and residential buildings. The west side is bordered by crop fields.

References

Lakes of Kansas
Protected areas of Shawnee County, Kansas
Lakes of Shawnee County, Kansas
Oxbow lakes of the United States